The Creoles of color are a historic ethnic group of Creole people that developed in the former French and Spanish colonies of Louisiana (especially in the city of New Orleans), Mississippi, Alabama, and Northwestern Florida i.e. Pensacola, Florida in what is now the United States. French colonists in Louisiana first used the term "Creole" to refer to people born in the colony, rather than in France.

The term "Creoles of color" was typically applied to mixed-race Creoles born from the French and Spanish settlers intermarrying with Africans or from manumitted slaves, forming a class of Gens de couleur libres (free people of color). Today, many of these Creoles of color have assimilated into Black culture, while some chose to remain a separate yet inclusive subsection of the African American ethnic group.

Historical Context

Créole is derived from latin and means to "create", and was first used in the "New World" by the Portuguese to describe local goods and products, but was later used by the Spanish during colonial occupation to mean any native inhabitant of the New World. The term Créole was first used by French colonists to distinguish themselves from foreign-born settlers, and later as distinct from Anglo-American settlers. Créole referred to people born in Louisiana whose ancestors were not born in the territory. Colonial documents show that the term Créole was used variously at different times to refer to white people, mixed-race people, and black people, both free-born and enslaved. The "of color" is considered a necessary qualifier, as "Creole"(Créole) did not convey any racial connotation.

During French colonization, social order was divided into three distinct categories: Creole aristocrats (grands habitants); a prosperous, educated group of multi-racial Creoles of European, African and Native American descent (bourgeoisie); and the far larger class of African slaves and Creole peasants (petits habitants). French Law regulated interracial conduct within the colony. An example of such laws are the Louisiana Code Noir. Though interracial relations were legally forbidden, or heavily restricted, they were not uncommon. Mixed-race Creoles of color became identified as a distinct ethnic group, Gens de couleur libres (free persons of color), and were granted their free-person status by the Louisiana Supreme Court in 1810. Some have suggested certain social markers of creole identity as being of Catholic faith, having a strong work ethic, being an avid fan of literature, and being fluent in French-- standard French, Creole and Cajun are all considered acceptable versions of the French language. For many, being a descendant of the Gens de couleur libres is an identity marker specific to Creoles of color.

Many Creoles of color were free-born, and their descendants often enjoyed many of the same privileges that whites did, including (but not limited to) property ownership, formal education, and service in the militia. During the antebellum period, their society was structured along class lines and they tended to marry within their group. While it was not illegal, it was a social taboo for Creoles of color to marry slaves and it was a rare occurrence. Some of the wealthier and prosperous Creoles of color owned slaves themselves. Other Creoles of color, such as Thomy Lafon, used their social position to support the abolitionist cause.

Another Creole of color, wealthy planter Francis E. Dumas, emancipated all of his slaves in 1863 and organized them into a company in the Second Regiment of the Louisiana Native Guards, in which he served as an officer.

Migration

First Wave 
The first wave of creole migration occurred between 1840 and 1890 with the majority of migrants fleeing to ethnic-dominant outskirts of larger US cities and abroad where race was more fluid.

Second Wave 
The reclassification of Creoles of color as black prompted the second migratory wave of Creoles of color between 1920 and 1940.

Military 
Creoles of Color had been members of the militia for decades under both French and Spanish control of the colony of Louisiana. For example, around 80 free Creoles of Color were recruited into the militia that participated in the Battle of Baton Rouge in 1779.
69
After the United States made the Louisiana Purchase in 1803 and acquired the large territory west of the Mississippi, the Creoles of color in New Orleans volunteered their services and pledged their loyalty to their new country. They also took an oath of loyalty to William C. C. Claiborne, the Louisiana Territorial Governor appointed by President Thomas Jefferson.

Months after the colony became part of the United States, Claiborne's administration was faced with a dilemma previously unknown in the U.S.; integration in the military by incorporating entire units of previously established "colored" militia. In a February 20, 1804 letter, Secretary of War Henry Dearborn wrote to Claiborne saying, "…it would be prudent not to increase the Corps, but to diminish, if it could be done without giving offense…"  A decade later, the militia of color that remained volunteered to take up arms when the British began landing troops on American soil outside of New Orleans in December 1814. This was the commencement of the Battle of New Orleans.

After the Louisiana Purchase, many Creoles of color lost their favorable social status, despite their service to the militia and their social status prior to the U.S. takeover. The territory and New Orleans became the destination of many migrants from the United States, as well as new immigrants. Migrants from the South imposed their caste system. In this new caste system, all people with African ancestry or visible African features were classified as black, and therefore categorized as second class citizens, regardless of their education, property ownership, or previous status in French society. Former free Creoles of Color were relegated to the ranks of emancipated slaves.

 
A notable creole family was that of Andrea Dimitry.  Dimitry was a Greek immigrant who married Marianne Céleste Dragon a woman of African and Greek ancestry around 1799.  Their son creole author and educator Alexander Dimitry was the first person of color to represent the United States as Ambassador to Costa Rica and Nicaragua. He was also the first superintendent of schools in Louisiana.  Andrea Dimitry's children were upper-class elite creole.  They were mostly educated at Georgetown University.  One of his daughters married into the English royal House of Stuart.  Some of the creole children were prominent members of the Confederate Government during the American Civil War.

Activism 
With the advantage of having been better educated than the new freedmen, many Creoles of color were active in the struggle for civil rights and served in political office during Reconstruction, helping to bring freedmen into the political system. During late Reconstruction, white Democrats regained political control of state legislatures across the former Confederate states by intimidation of blacks and other Republicans at the polls. Through the late nineteenth century, they worked to impose white supremacy under Jim Crow laws and customs. They disfranchised the majority of blacks, especially by creating barriers to voter registration through devices such as poll taxes, literacy tests, grandfather clauses, etc., stripping African Americans, including Creoles of color, of political power.

Creoles of color were among the African Americans who were limited when the U.S. Supreme Court ruled in the case of Plessy v. Ferguson in 1896, deciding that "separate but equal" accommodations were constitutional. It permitted states to impose Jim Crow rules on federal railways and later interstate buses.

On June 14, 2013 Louisiana Governor Bobby Jindal signed into law Act 276, creating the "prestige" license plate stating "I'm Creole", in honor of the Creoles' contributions, culture, and heritage.

Education 
It was common for wealthy francophone Gens de couleur to study in Europe, with some opting to not return due to greater liberties in France. When not educated abroad, or in whites-only schools in the United States by virtue of passing, Creoles of color were often homeschooled or enrolled in private schools. These private schools were often financed and staffed by affluent Creoles of color. For example, L'Institute Catholique was financed by Madame Marie Couvent with writers Armand Lanusse and Jonnai Questy serving as educators.

In 1850 it was determined that 80% of all Gens de couleur libres were literate; a figure significantly higher than the white population of Louisiana at the time.

Contribution to the arts

Literature 
During the antebellum period, well-educated francophone gens de couleur libres contributed extensively to literary collections, such as Les Cenelles, with a significant portion of these works dedicated to describing the conditions of their enslaved compatriots. One example of such texts is Le Mulatre (The Mulatto) by Victor Séjour, a Creole of color. Other themes approached aspects of love, religion and many texts were likened to French romanticism. In daily newspapers locally and abroad, pieces written by Creoles of color were prominent. Even during the ban on racial commentary during the antebellum period, pieces written by these creoles reformulated existing french themes to subtly critique race relations in Louisiana, while still gaining in popularity among all readers.

Music

Some Creoles of color trained as classical musicians in 19th-century Louisiana. These musicians would often study with those associated with the French Opera House; some traveled to Paris to complete their studies. Creole composers of that time are discussed in Music and Some Highly Musical People by James Monroe Trotter, and Nos Hommes et Notre Histoire by Rodolphe Lucien Desdunes.

Notable classical Creole musicians
Basile Barès
Edmund Dédé
Laurent Dubuclet
Louis Moreau Gottschalk
Lucien-Léon Guillaume Lambert
Charles Lucien Lambert
Sidney Lambert
Victor-Eugene McCarty
Samuel Snaër

Jazz musicians

Creoles of color from the New Orleans area were active in defining the earliest days of jazz. Some of the most notable names:

 Vernel Fournier
 George Baquet
 Paul Barbarin
 Louis Barbarin
 Danny Barker
 Emile Barnes
 Paul Barnes
 Sidney Bechet
 Barney Bigard
 Louis Cottrell, Sr.
 Louis Cottrell, Jr.
 Joe Darensbourg
 Louis Nelson Delisle
 Cie Frazier
 Illinois Jacquet
 Freddie Keppard
 Lawrence Marrero
 Jelly Roll Morton (Ferdinand J. LaMothe)
 Albert Nicholas
 Kid Ory
 Manuel Perez
 Jimmy Palao
 Alcide Pavageau
 Alphonse Picou
 De De Pierce
 Armand J. Piron
 John Robichaux
 Omer Simeon
 Lorenzo Tio
Eddie Bo

See also
 List of Louisiana Creoles
 Louisiana Creole people
 Louisiana French
 Louisiana Creole
 Cane River Creole National Historical Park
 Melrose Plantation
 Faubourg Marigny
 Tremé
 Little New Orleans
 Frenchtown, Houston
 Magnolia Springs, Alabama

References

Further reading

External links
Henry, LaFleur, and Simien (July 2015). "In their words: We are all Creole", DailyWorld.com.
History Detectives, S7E2: "'Creole Poems'", PBS.org.
C.R.E.O.L.E. Inc. ("An organization dedicated to preserving the Creole Heritage.")
ZydecoNation.org (documentary)
Nightline (December ): "Test Suggests 'Black' Man Is Really Not", ABCNews.Go.com.
Le Melle, Stacy Parker (2013). "Quadroons for Beginners: Discussing the Suppressed and Sexualized History of Free Women of Color with Author Emily Clark", HuffingtonPost.com.
Duggar, Nikki (2009). "I Am What I Say I Am: Racial and Cultural Identity among Creoles of Color in New Orleans", ScholarWorks.UNO.edu. (PDF)
Landry, Christophe (2015). "A Creole Melting Pot: the Politics of Language, Race, and Identity in southwest Louisiana, 1918-45", Academia.edu.
Landry, Christophe (2016). "Beyoncé and Solange Knowles breaking boundaries", MyLHCV.com.
Rosenberg, Jeremy (2012). "Michelle Covington: The Great Migration and Creole Cooking", KCET.org.
Tervalon, Jervey (2006). "The Creole Connection", LAWeekly.com.
Flaccus, Gillian (2005). "After Katrina, transplanted Creoles vow to keep culture alive", Legacy.SanDiegoUnionTribune.com.
Goodrich, Juliette (2013). "Bay Area Grammy Nominee Represents Local Creole Community", SanFrancisco.CBSLocal.com.
Fuselier, Herman (2016). "Cluse: 'Creole is a lot more than people think'", TheAdvertiser.com.
"Finding Agnes", BlogSpot.com.

Creole peoples
.
.02
African-American cultural history
African-American society
Ethnic groups in Alabama
Ethnic groups in Louisiana
Ethnic groups in Mississippi
Ethnic groups in the United States
.01
Louisiana society
Mulatto
People of Louisiana (New France)